Nikolić, meaning "son of Nikola", is a common South Slavic surname and is found in Bosnia and Herzegovina, Croatia, Montenegro, Austria and  Serbia. Nikolić is the third most frequent surname in Serbia, and is also common in Croatia, with 6,353 carriers (2011 census).

It may refer to the following people:

Aleksandar Nikolić (1924–2000), basketball player and coach
Aleksandra Nikolić (born 1990), fashion model
Ana Nikolić (born 1978), Serbian singer
Andrew Nikolic (born 1961), Australian politician, retired Australian Army brigadier
Dragan Nikolić (1943–2016), actor
Jelena Nikolić (born 1982), Serbian volleyball player 
Maja Nikolić (born 1975), Serbian singer
Marijan Nikolić (born 1981), Croatian footballer
Marko Nikolić (disambiguation), several people
Milan Nikolić (musician) (born 1979), Serbian accordionist
Milan Nikolić (footballer, born 1987), Serbian footballer
Milijana Nikolic (born 1975), opera soprano
Milorad Nikolić (1920–2006), footballer
Miloš Nikolić (disambiguation), several people
Momir Nikolić (born 1955), Bosnian Serbian former Assistant Chief of Security and Intelligence for the Bosnian Serb Army
Nebojša Nikolić (born 1968), Bosnian chess master
Nemanja Nikolić (disambiguation), several people
Nenad Nikolić (disambiguation), several people
Predrag Nikolić (born 1960), Bosnian chess grandmaster
Siniša Nikolić (born 1967), Yugoslav footballer
Sladjan Nikolic (born 1974), Serbian football manager and former midfielder
Srdjan Nikolić (born 1976), Serbian rugby union player
Stefan Nikolić (disambiguation), several people
Stevo Nikolić (born 1984), Bosnian Serb footballer
Stojan "Niki" Nikolic (born 1949), former Yugoslav-American soccer defender
Tomislav Nikolić (1952–), Serbian President
Uroš Nikolić (footballer) (born 1987), Serbian basketball player
Uroš Nikolić (basketball) (born 1993), Serbian football midfielder
Vera Nikolić (1948–2021), Serbian track and field athlete 
Vera Nikolić Podrinska (1886–1972), Croatian painter and baroness
Vinko Nikolić (1912–1997), Croatian writer and journalist
Vito Nikolić (1934–1994), Montenegrin poet
Millosh Gjergj Nikolla (born as Miloš Nikolić; 1911–1938), Albanian poet
Zoran M. Nikolić

Other
House of Nikolić, Serbian noble house

See also

Nikolajević

References

Serbian surnames
Croatian surnames
Patronymic surnames
Surnames from given names